West New Territories was a constituency elected by electoral college for the Legislative Council of Hong Kong in 1985 and 1988, which elects one member of the Legislative Council using the multiple-round elimination system and preferential elimination system respectively. The constituency covers Yuen Long District and Tuen Mun District in New Territories.

The constituency is indirectly elected, with members of the District Boards and Urban Council from the two Districts as the electorates. The electorate of the constituency was expanded in 1991.

Returned members
Elected members are as follows:

Election results 
Only the final results of the run-off are shown.

References 

Constituencies of Hong Kong
New Territories
Constituencies of Hong Kong Legislative Council
1985 establishments in Hong Kong
Constituencies established in 1985